The Guardian : a weekly journal of politics, commerce, agriculture, literature, science and arts for the middle and working classes of New South Wales  is a defunct Australian newspaper that was published in Sydney New South Wales, during 1844 in Sydney, New South Wales, Australia.

History
The newspaper began with the edition of Saturday March 16 1844, and continued in a run of twenty four editions before ceasing publication on 5 October 1844. The newspaper was published by James McEachern, brother of Robert S. McEachern, the proprietor of the Free Press and Commercial Journal and the Sydney Free Press.

Digitisation
The various editions of the paper have been digitised as part of the Australian Newspapers Digitisation Program, a project hosted by the National Library of Australia.

References

External links

See also 
 List of newspapers in New South Wales
 List of newspapers in Australia

Defunct newspapers published in Sydney
New England (New South Wales)
Newspapers on Trove